Tetragenococcus is a gram-positive, facultatively aerobic, moderately halophilic and nonmotile bacterial genus from the family of Enterococcaceae.

References

Further reading 
 
 
 
 

Enterococcaceae
Bacteria genera